Year 188 (CLXXXVIII) was a leap year starting on Monday of the Julian calendar. At the time, it was known in the Roman Empire as the Year of the Consulship of Fuscianus and Silanus (or, less frequently, year 941 Ab urbe condita). The denomination 188 for this year has been used since the early medieval period, when the Anno Domini calendar era became the prevalent method in Europe for naming years.

Events

By place

Roman Empire 
 Publius Helvius Pertinax becomes pro-consul of Africa from 188 to 189.

Japan 
 Queen Himiko (or Shingi Waō) begins her reign in Japan (until 248).

Births 
 April 4 – Caracalla (or Antoninus), Roman emperor (d. 217)
 Lu Ji (or Gongji), Chinese official and politician (d. 219)
 Sun Shao, Chinese general of the Eastern Wu state (d. 241)

Deaths 
 March 17 – Julian, pope and patriarch of Alexandria
 Fa Zhen (or Gaoqing), Chinese scholar (b. AD 100)
 Lucius Antistius Burrus, Roman politician (executed)
 Ma Xiang, Chinese rebel leader (approximate date)
 Publius Atilius Aebutianus, Roman prefect (executed)
 Shusun Tong, Chinese official and ritual specialist
 Qiangqui, Chinese ruler of the southern Xiongnu

See also 
 Ab urbe condita
 Roman numerals

References